Ashraf Uddin Ahmed Uzzal (known by the stage name Uzzal; 28 April 1946) is a Bangladeshi film actor, producer and director. In the film, he made his film debut with Subhash Dutta directed film Binimoy. In addition to acting in the film, he also produced and directed films. He acted in over 100 films and also in about 100 television plays. Notable films in which he starred include Arunodoyer Agnishakkhi and Nalish. His directorial films are Shakti Porikkha, Tibro Protibad, and Paaper Shasti.

Early life
Uzzal was born in Jantihar village, Shahzadpur, Pabna District in the then British India. He was a student of the University of Dhaka. He passed MA in International Relations in 1970 from Dhaka University. While staying at the SM hall of Dhaka University in 1967–69, he played the role of a hero in the play of the university or in the drama played by TSC and Sujata or Rubina was his co-artist.

Career
From 1967 to 1969 he used to play drama on Dhaka Television. In 1970, Uzzal debuted his acting career in Subhash Dutta's film Binimoy. He made his first film debuted with actress Kabori. Then in 1972, he played role in Yousuf Zahir's directed comedy-dramatic film Ieye Korey Biye with Bulbul Ahmed and Babita. In the same year, he played role in Subhash Dutta directed film Arunodoyer Agnishakkhi based on Bangladesh War of Liberation. Over the years he acted with actresses like Kabori, Rozina, Bobita, Shabana, Shabnam, Sucharita and Dolly Anwar. He got a leg injury during the shooting of the film Oporadh. He acted in the roles of films like Janata Express, Kudraat and Phooler Shori after the accident.

Uzzal also directed the films Shakti Porikkha, Tibro Protibad, and Paaper Shasti.

Uzzal is involved in the Film Producers and Distributors Association and a member of the Film Censor Board.

Political career 
He is very active in politics. He was senior vice president of Jatiyatabadi Samajik Sangskritik Sangstha (Jasas), cultural wing of Bangladesh Nationalist Party (BNP).

Filmography 

As director 
Shokti Porikkha (1994)
Tibro Protibad
Paper Shasti

References

External links
 

Living people
1946 births
People from Pabna District
University of Dhaka alumni
Bangladeshi male television actors
Bangladeshi male film actors
Bangladeshi film directors